is a Japanese professional baseball pitcher for the Hanshin Tigers of the Nippon Professional Baseball (NPB).

Early baseball career
Hiroto started baseball early when he played catcher for his school's team in his first grade. He specialized as a pitcher in junior high, and helped his team win championships and runner ups in his hometown's local tournaments.

He then went on to become the ace pitcher of Soma Shufu High School, where in his 2nd year, he led the team to win runner up in the prefectural tournament.  Despite his team never making it to either Spring Koshien or Summer Koshien, his 140 km/h fastball caught the attention of both NPB and MLB scouts alike.

Professional career
Hanshin Tigers selected Saiki with the third selection in the 2016 NPB draft. He signed a 50 million yen contract with the Tigers, with an estimated 6 million yen annual salary. He was assigned the jersey number 35.

On December 2, 2020, he become a free agent. On December 8, 2020, Saiki re-signed with the Tigers.

Playing Style
Standing at 189 cm, Saiki is a right-handed pitcher whose arsenal consists of fastballs clocked at a maximum of 152 km/h, sliders, curveballs and splitters. In addition, he also has recently started throwing a cutter. He aims to follow the footsteps of his teammate and fellow high-school draft Shintaro Fujinami who is known for his high velocity pitches.

References

External links
NPB stats
 

1998 births
Living people
Baseball people from Hyōgo Prefecture
Hanshin Tigers players
Japanese baseball players
Nippon Professional Baseball pitchers